Campbell Alliance was a specialized management consulting firm that served the pharmaceutical and biotechnology industry.  The firm was founded in 1997 by John Campbell, a former executive of GlaxoWellcome, now GlaxoSmithKline, and is a consulting business segment of inVentiv Health, Inc.

Headquartered in Raleigh, North Carolina, Campbell Alliance had 9 offices across the United States, each of which is located in a city that has a significant pharmaceutical or biotech industry presence:

Atlanta
Boston
Chicago
Los Angeles
New York
Parsippany
Philadelphia
Raleigh
San Francisco

In 2011, the Company was acquired by inVentiv Health (now Syneos Health)

Organization

The firm is organized into seven practice areas, each of which is a specialized team providing consulting services to a specific function within the pharmaceutical and biotech industry.  Each practice area is led by a vice president or senior vice president-level executive, who has profit and loss responsibility for the practice.

Consulting team members at Campbell Alliance are assigned to a practice area on the basis of their work experience, interests, and specific areas of expertise.  The firm’s practice areas include:

Brand Management:  New product planning, commercial strategy development, product launch planning and management, in-line brand strategy and planning, and commercial capability design and development
Business Development:  Corporate and business development strategy, licensing opportunity evaluation, and transaction support
Clinical Development:  Organizational design and operations improvement in clinical development
Managed Markets:  Pharmaceutical pricing, reimbursement and access strategy
Medical Affairs:  Organizational and product-focused consulting in medical affairs
Trade and Distribution:  Pharmaceutical trade, distribution, and specialty pharmacy strategy
Sales:  Sales strategy development and sales training

Clients

The firm’s clients include most of world’s top 50 pharmaceutical companies, as well as a range of emerging and midsize firms.  The firm is typically engaged by director or vice president-level clients who lead functional areas served by Campbell Alliance’s practice areas.  The firm is also engaged by C-level executives when their consulting needs cut across multiple functions or are related to issues of strategic importance at the corporate level.  The firm primarily serves clients throughout the United States and Europe.

Recognition

Fast 50 Company (Triangle Business Journal):  Eight consecutive listings on the annual Fast 50 ranking of the 50 fastest-growing private companies based in the Research Triangle Park (RTP) region of North Carolina, 2002-2009
Best Places to Work (Triangle Business Journal):  Ranked as one of the best places to work in the RTP region of North Carolina, 2007 and 2008
Inc. 500 (Inc. Magazine):  Ranked No. 171 on Inc. Magazine’s list of the fastest-growing private companies in the US, 2003
Inc. 5000 (Inc. Magazine):  Listed on the Inc. 5000 list of the fastest-growing private companies in the United States, 2007
Finalist, American Business Awards 2004:  Best Overall Company (Up to 100 Employees category)
Ernst & Young Entrepreneur of the Year (EOY) Awards:  John Campbell named EOY Award Finalist, Carolinas Region, 2003, 2004, and 2005.  EOY Award Winner, Health Sciences Category, Carolinas Region, 2006.

Subsidiary:  The Pharmaceutical Institute

Campbell Alliance has one wholly owned subsidiary, the Pharmaceutical Institute, also based in Raleigh, NC.  The Pharmaceutical Institute develops training and educational resources for professionals working in the pharmaceutical and biotech industry.  The firm offers a range of e-courses on various business aspects related to the industry, as well as medical and science-oriented e-courses on major therapeutic areas.  The firm also develops custom courses and training programs for its clients.

External links
Campbell Alliance Corporate Web Site
Pharmaceutical Institute Corporate Web Site

References

Consulting firms established in 1997
Privately held companies based in North Carolina
International management consulting firms